24th Battalion may refer to:

24th Battalion (Australia), an infantry battalion of the Australian Army that served in World War I
 2/24th Battalion (Australia), an infantry battalion of the Australian Army that served in World War II
 24th Battalion (International Brigade),  Cuban volunteer unit that fought for the Republicans during the Spanish Civil War
 24th Battalion (Victoria Rifles), CEF, a Canadian infantry battalion that served in World War I
 24th Battalion (New Zealand), a World War II infantry battalion from New Zealand
 24th Battalion (Ukraine), a volunteer battalion of the Ukrainian Army that served in War in Donbas
 24th Battalion, Royal Fusiliers (2nd Sportsmen's)

See also
 24th Division (disambiguation)
 24th Brigade (disambiguation)
 24th Regiment (disambiguation)